Mephentermine (Wyamine, former brandname) is a cardiac stimulant.

It has been used as a treatment for low blood pressure.

Mephentermine belongs to the class of adrenergic and dopaminergic cardiac stimulants excluding glycosides. Used in the treatment of heart failure.

Mechanism of action
Mephentermine appears to act by indirect stimulation of β-adrenergic receptors causing the release of norepinephrine from its storage sites. It has a positive inotropic effect on the myocardium. AV conduction and refractory period of AV node is shortened with an increase in ventricular conduction velocity. It dilates arteries and arterioles in the skeletal muscle and mesenteric vascular beds, leading to an increase in venous return.

Its onset is 5 to–15 minutes with intramuscular dosing, and immediate with intravenous dosing.

Its duration of action is four hours with intramuscular dosing and 30 minutes with intravenous dosing.

Indication and dosage
For maintenance of blood pressure in hypotensive states, the dose for adults is 30–45 mg as a single dose, repeated as necessary or followed by intravenous infusion of 0.1% mephentermine in 5% dextrose, with the rate and duration of administration depending on the patient's response.

For hypotension secondary to spinal anaesthesia in obstetric patients, the dose for adults is 15 mg as a single dose, repeated if needed. The maximum dose 30 mg.

Caution

Contraindications
Low blood pressure caused by phenothiazines, hypertension, and pheochromocytoma.

Special Precautions
Patients receiving monoamine oxidase inhibitors. 
For shock due to loss of blood or fluid, give fluid replacement therapy primarily, cardiovascular disease, hypertension, hyperthyroidism, chronic illnesses, lactation, pregnancy, skin dryness. headache.

Adverse Drug Reactions
The most common side effects are drowsiness, incoherence, hallucinations, convulsions, slow heart rate (reflex bradycardia). Fear, anxiety, restlessness, tremor, insomnia, confusion, irritability, and psychosis. Nausea, vomiting, reduced appetite, urinary retention, dyspnea, weakness, neck pain

Potentially fatal reactions are due to atrioventricular block, central nervous system stimulation, cerebral hemorrhage, pulmonary edema, and ventricular arrhythmias.

Drug Interactions
Mephentermine antagonizes effect of agents that lower blood pressure. Severe hypertension may occur with monoamine oxidase inhibitors and possibly tricyclic antidepressants. Additive vasoconstricting effects occur with ergot alkaloids, and oxytocin.

Potentially fatal drug interactions are the risk of abnormal heart rhythm in people undergoing anesthesia with cyclopropane and halothane.

References 

Substituted amphetamines
Alpha-adrenergic agonists
Cardiac stimulants
Norepinephrine releasing agents
Decongestants
Carbonic anhydrase activators